The National Association for Rational Sexual Offense Laws (NARSOL) is a national civil rights and justice reform organization headquartered in Raleigh, North Carolina with operations based in Albuquerque, New Mexico and with affiliated organizations, advocates, and contacts in the vast majority of states. NARSOL and its affiliates are part of the growing movement to reform sexual offense laws in the United States. NARSOL asserts that while sex offender registries in the United States were originally well-intentioned and for the most heinous and dangerous sex offenders only, their reach has exponentially widened to include petty offenses such as teen sexting and consensual relations between young people. NARSOL has generated media attention by arranging national conferences in multiple cities including Boston, Albuquerque, Los Angeles Dallas, Atlanta, Cleveland, Houston, and Raleigh, and by being involved in numerous lawsuits challenging the constitutionality of sex offender registration and notification laws.

Purpose
While NARSOL believes that offenders should be held accountable in court of law, it criticizes current sex offender registry laws in the United States. NARSOL asserts that current sex offender laws are not based on scientific evidence. These claims are supported by scientific research, and professional organizations such as Association for the Treatment of Sexual Abusers have presented similar critiques.

Support Assistance
NARSOL is an advocacy organization, not a support organization. Additionally, NARSOL is not a legal organization and is unable to provide legal advice or help with individual legal cases or issues. NARSOL encourages the development of Fearless Groups, which are dynamic self-sustaining support groups.

NARSOL is publishes a newsletter called the Digest.

NARSOL also has a number of other online resources such as "NARSOL in Action" which is a YouTube Podcast series with updates about national litigation, and  "Resources" which is an online reference site for legal counsel, news and events, educational resources, employment resources, financial resources and other support groups.

Lawsuits

NARSOL's former Californian chapter, CA RSOL, challenged ordinances governing registered sex offenders in federal court across the state of California.
During 2014 over 20 municipalities were sued by CA RSOL. As of October 11, 15 of the lawsuits had been settled, 38 cities had avoided litigation by revoking their sex offender ordinances, and 6 cities had chosen to discontinue enforcing the ordinances. At the time, sex offender ordinances were under review in 18 additional cities. These efforts culminated in March 2015 when Supreme Court of California declared residency restrictions unconstitutional citing their unfairness and counterproductive effects. Similar lawsuits by the RSOL's Texas chapter forced some Texas towns to ease their residency restrictions in early 2016.

NARSOL's Maryland chapter, FAIR (Families Advocating Intelligent Registries) has played a significant role in reversing the retroactive application of registry laws in the state of Maryland. They were part of the Amicus Curiae cited in the March 2013 Court of Appeals decision Doe v. DPSCS which declared that Maryland's existing sex offender registry laws are punitive in effect, and therefore could not constitutionally be applied retroactively to persons whose crimes pre-dated registration. This decision was further solidified in 2014 with the "Doe 2" decision. The full impact of these decisions in Maryland is still being affected.

 Packingham v. North Carolina, 582 U.S. __ (2017), 15–1194. NARSOL filed a successful amicus to the U.S. Supreme Court regarding First Amendment, overbreadth: social media prohibitions.
 Merideth v. Stein, Case No. 5:17-cv-528. NARSOL provided successful strategy assistance to this case in Federal District Court, Eastern District of North Carolina.
 Freitas, et al v. Kilmartin, et al, Case No. 1:15-cv-00450. NARSOL provided funding in this case to retroactively impose a 1000-foot residency restriction in Rhode Island. An injunction was granted.
 Pending: Millard v. Rankin, 265 F. Supp. 3d 1211 (D. Colo. 2017). NARSOL provided an Amicus to challenge enhanced restrictions, ex post facto, cruel & unusual to the Tenth Circuit Court of Appeals.
 Pending: May v. Ryan, 245 F. Supp. 3d 1145 (D. Ariz. 2017). NARSOL provided an amicus regarding burden shifting to the Ninth Circuit Court of Appeals
 Pending: Bethea v. North Carolina, Case No.18-308. NARSOL provided an Amicus regarding ex-post facto challenge to North Carolina's registry.
 Pending: NARSOL v. Stein, Case No. 1:17-cv-53. NARSOL served as the plaintiff in this ex post facto challenge to the North Carolina registry. Federal District Court, North Carolina Middle District.
 Pending: NCRSOL v. Stein, Case No. 1:18-cv-597. NARSOL's affiliate NCRSOL (North Carolina Rational Sexual Offense Laws) provided funding in the First & Fourth Amendment challenge to premises restrictions.
 Pending: Prison Legal News v. Secretary, Florida Dept of Corrections, Case No. 18-355. NARSOL provided an amicus in this First Amendment challenge to prison circulation restrictions. U.S. Supreme Court.

See also
Arkansas Time After Time
Florida Action Committee
Illinois Voices for Reform
Michigan Citizens for Justice

References

External links
National Association for Rational Sexual Offense Laws
Vivante Espero
Registrants and Families Support Line

Sex offender registration
Civil liberties advocacy groups in the United States
Sex offender registries in the United States